Turnaround  in filmmaking is the use of outside assistance to resolve problems preventing a film project completing its development phase and entering the preproduction phase. A project stuck in development phase is said to be in development hell.

Background

The outside help needed in order to get a film project into turnaround may appear in the form of new money being invested into a project in development hell, or it might come along as another outside studio taking interest in a project which the original studio may find difficult to move forward into the pre-production phase. When an outside source takes over a film project from development hell in one studio and transfers the film project to another studio which is willing to invest further resources to move the project into pre-production, then the project is said to have gone through a 'turnaround'. The film project is now to be able to move forward out of development hell in one studio into the pre-production phase of filmmaking at another studio. 

The term 'turnaround' is borrowed from business operations and management consulting, where it is used to describe business ventures which are in some form of insolvency and require a 'business turnaround' or 'management turnaround' in order to become profitable and make a 'turnaround' in business performance. In the case of the filmmaking process, the transfer of the film project from development hell, at one studio, leading to the project receiving a green light to begin pre-production, at another studio, is referred to as a 'turnaround' for that film.

Informal descriptions
A 'turnaround' or 'turnaround deal' is occasionally used to describe an arrangement in the film industry whereby the production costs of a project that one studio has developed are declared a loss on the company's tax return, thereby preventing the studio from exploiting the property any further. The rights can then be sold to another studio in exchange for the cost of development plus interest.

Examples
Michael Cieply defined the term in The New York Times as "arrangements under which producers can move a project from one studio to another under certain conditions". Some examples include:

Columbia Pictures stopped production of Steven Spielberg's E.T. the Extra-Terrestrial. However, Universal Pictures picked up the film and made it a success.
The turnaround of The Boondock Saints is documented in Overnight, a 2003 documentary that mainly focuses on the perspective of how director Troy Duffy "fell" in Hollywood.
The 1993 film My Life's in Turnaround, starring Donal Lardner Ward, Eric Schaeffer, Martha Plimpton and Phoebe Cates, tells the story of two friends who attempt to sell the story of their lives to a variety of studios.
After the rights to adapt Stephenie Meyer's novel Twilight were purchased by MTV Films in 2004, they were optioned by Paramount Pictures where it remained in turnaround before they let the rights lapse in 2007. Summit Entertainment picked them up and released Twilight in 2008. 
The 2012 film Argo makes several references to the film that was faked for the 1980 CIA Iranian hostage extraction operation as being "in turnaround".

References and notes

Film production
Intellectual property law